Manjushas are an Indian art form.  They are temple-shaped boxes comprising eight pillars. They are made of bamboo, jute, and paper. They also contain paintings of Hindu gods and goddesses and other characters. These boxes are used in Bishahari puja, a festival dedicated to the Snake God that is celebrated in Bhagalpur and nearby regions, India.

Importance
Manjusha Art is an ancient and historically significant art form of Bhagalpur, Bihar.  Manjusha Art or Manjusha Kala is often referred to as Snake Paintings by foreigners as swirling snakes in the artist depict the central character Bihula's tale of love and sacrifice. A recent study on Manjusha Art  provides an excellent example of how this art reflects the history of ancient Anga Mahajanapada.

Characteristic of Manjusha Art 
 Three colors are used in Manjusha Art
 In Manjusha Art Borders are very Important.
 Manjusha Art is a Line drawing Art.
 Manjusha Art is a Folk Art.
 Manjusha Art is a Scroll Painting.
 Manjusha Art is completely based on the folklore of Bihula-Bishari.
 In Manjusha Art Characters are displayed as X letter of English Alphabets.
 Major Motifs of Manjusha Art – Snake, Champa Flower, Sun, Moon, Elephant, Turtle, Fish, Maina Bird, Kamal Flower, Kalash Pot, Arrow Bow, ShivLing, Tree etc.
 Major Characters of Manjusha Art – Lord Shiva, Mansa DeVi (Bishari), Bihula, Bala, Hanuman, Chandu Saudagar
 Borders in Manjusha Art – Belpatr, Lehariya, Triangle, Mokha and series of Snakes.

Artists and awards 
 First time in 2012, Late Chakravarty Devi awarded with SITA DEVI AWARD in the field of Manjusha Art.
 In 2013, Shrimati Nirmala Devi awarded with Bihar Kala Award "SITA DEVI AWARD".
 In the field of Manjusha Art, First State Award given to Shri Manoj Pandit for his work towards revival of indigenous art form "Manjusha Art". This award is given by Upendra Maharathi Shilp Anusandhan Sansthan  & Dept. of Industries, Bihar.
 On Recommendation of Art, culture and youth affairs department, Bihar; Ministry of Culture (Sanskriti Mantralaya) awarded ‘Manjusha Kala Guru Award’ to Shri Manoj Pandit in 2014.
 In 2016 - Ulupi Jha is one of the 100 successful women across the country selected by the Union ministry of women and child development on the basis of online voting for her Manjusha painting.

See also
Angika
Anga Lipi
Anga Mahajanapada
Anga

References

Further reading
 (see index: p. 148-152)

External links
Manjushakala.in - Initiative for promotion of Manjusha Art

 Culture of Bihar
 Hindu art
 Bhagalpur
Indian art